Ahillen Rajakumaran Beadle is a Bahraini-born Australian cricketer of Sri Lankan descent who has represented Australia and the Sydney Thunder. He made his debut for the Sydney Thunder in the 2014–15 season and was a member of the Thunder's championship-winning squad in the 2015/16 season. He has also represented Australia at the under 19s level in cricket.

He only has one kidney, due to an injury sustained whilst playing grade cricket. This cost him years of his career.

References

External links
 Sydney Thunder Profile
 

Australian people of Sri Lankan descent
1986 births
Australian cricketers
Sydney Thunder cricketers
Living people